The American Educational Trust (AET) is a non-profit foundation incorporated in Washington, D.C., under taxation provision 501(c)4 by retired U.S. foreign service officers. Because of AET's activities to influence the political process, donations to the AET are not tax deductible. The AET is best known for publishing the Washington Report on Middle East Affairs ("The Washington Report") or ("WRMEA").

Organization
AET's founders included Edward Firth Henderson, the AET's first chairman, and a former British Ambassador to Qatar; Andrew Killgore, AET's first president, who was U.S. Ambassador to when he retired from the United States Foreign Service in 1980; and Richard Curtiss, AET's first executive director, who was chief inspector of the U.S. Information Agency when he retired from the U.S. Foreign Service in 1980.

AET's Foreign Policy Committee has included former U.S. ambassadors, government officials, and members of the United States Congress, including the late Democratic Senator J. William Fulbright, and Republican Senator Charles Percy, both former chairmen of the Senate Foreign Relations Committee, and members of its board of directors and advisory committees "receive no fees for their services."

The Washington Report's "nonprofit wing has donated 3,200 free subscriptions" and dozens of books to libraries.

AET Book Club
Early in AET's development, its founders established the AET Book Club "to meet the recognized need for quality books about the region and U.S. policies there". AET began importing thousands of titles about the Middle East from Europe, four times a year via TransAtlantic shipment with sea containers. AET claims "Years later, American publishers began to recognize the market for quality, objective books about the Middle East, and began printing thousands of titles in the United States."

PACT
In August 2003, AET partnered with Celebrate Presence, a project in Hereford, MD selling Palestinian arts and crafts, to create International Marketing for Middle Eastern Artisans (IMMEA). In 2005, AET assumed responsibility for a large portion of the project, and these products were officially incorporated into the organization as the Palestinian Arts & Crafts Trust (PACT).

Remember These Children
The AET runs a website, Remember These Children, which lists all Palestinian and Israeli children killed in the current intifada (since September 29, 2000). The website follows on from two booklets (“Who Will Save the Children?” and “Remember These Children”), which were published in conjunction with Americans for Middle East Understanding, Jews for Peace in Palestine and Israel (now merged into Jewish Voice for Peace), and Black Voices for Peace.

Other activities
In 2004, AET’s Andrew Killgore spearheaded a letter to President Bush signed by a number of former British and U.S. diplomats objecting to US policy towards Israel and the Palestinians, especially then Prime Minister Ariel Sharon's plan to leave Gaza without bothering to negotiate with Palestinian representatives.

References

External links
 American Educational Trust
 AET Book Club

Educational organizations based in the United States
Political advocacy groups in the United States
501(c)(4) nonprofit organizations